The 2022 Calgary National Bank Challenger was a professional tennis tournament played on indoor hard courts. It was the third edition of the tournament which was part of the 2022 ATP Challenger Tour and the first edition of the tournament which was part of the 2022 ITF Women's World Tennis Tour. It took place in Calgary, Canada between 7 and 13 November 2022.

Champions

Men's singles

  Dominik Koepfer def.  Aleksandar Vukic 6–2, 6–4.

Women's singles

  Robin Montgomery def.  Urszula Radwańska,  7–6(8–6), 7–5

Men's doubles

  Maximilian Neuchrist /  Michail Pervolarakis def.  Julian Ocleppo /  Kai Wehnelt 6–4, 6–4.

Women's doubles

  Catherine Harrison /  Sabrina Santamaria def.  Kayla Cross /  Marina Stakusic, 7–6(7–2), 6–4

Men's singles main draw entrants

Seeds

1 Rankings are as of 31 October 2022.

Other entrants 
The following players received wildcards into the singles main draw:
  Justin Boulais
  Cleeve Harper
  Jaden Weekes

The following player received entry into the singles main draw using a protected ranking:
  Julian Ocleppo

The following players received entry into the singles main draw as alternates:
  Malek Jaziri
  Max Hans Rehberg

The following players received entry from the qualifying draw:
  Arthur Fery
  Johannes Härteis
  Maks Kaśnikowski
  Maximilian Neuchrist
  Alfredo Perez
  Michail Pervolarakis

Women's singles main draw entrants

Seeds

 1 Rankings are as of 31 October 2022.

Other entrants
The following players received wildcards into the singles main draw:
  Kayla Cross
  Alexia Jacobs
  Mia Kupres
  Layne Sleeth

The following player received entry into the singles main draw using a protected ranking:
  Sabine Lisicki

The following players received entry from the qualifying draw:
  Elysia Bolton
  Teah Chavez
  Carmen Corley
  Ana Grubor
  Martyna Ostrzygalo
  Johanne Svendsen

The following player received entry as a lucky loser:
  Choi Ji-hee

References

External links
 2022 Calgary National Bank Challenger at ITFtennis.com
 Official website

2022 ATP Challenger Tour
2022 ITF Women's World Tennis Tour
2022 in Canadian tennis
November 2022 sports events in Canada